Toor may refer to:

 toor (Unix) a secondary root account
 Pigeon pea, or toor dal
 A branch of the Tomar/Tanwar Dynasty

People with the surname
 Cecil J. Toor (1895–1969), American football coach
 Devinder Toor (born 1967/1968), Canadian politician
 Frances Toor (1890–1956), American author, anthropologist and ethnographer
 Kabir Toor (born 1990), English cricketer
 Krishna Kumar Toor (fl. 2012), Urdu poet
 Salman Toor, Pakistani-born American painter 
 Tejinder Pal Singh Toor (born 1994), Indian shot putter
 Yahya Toor (born 1962), Pakistani cricketer

van Toor
 Aad and Bas van Toor, a former Dutch circus duo called Bassie & Adriaan
 Jacob van Toor (1576–1618), Dutch preacher and theologian

See also
 Tally Toor a tower in Scotland